Punchavayal is a village in Mundakayam panchayath of Kanjirappally taluk in the Indian state of Kerala.
An Aided Arts and science college is present in this village. Punchavayal includes the places nearby Murikkumvayal, Pachima, Pakkanam, Kadamanthode, Kulamakkal and Moonnoly. It is approximately 6 km away by road from Mundakayam the doorway to the high ranges of southern Kerala, and is at the border of Kottayam and Idukki districts.

Economy
Punchavayal is a land of coffee, pepper, cocoa and natural rubber.

Administration
Punchavayal is a part of Poonjar Constituency for Kerala Legislative Assembly Elections and part of Pathanamthitta (Lok Sabha constituency) for Indian General Elections. P. C. George of Kerala Janapaksham is the sitting MLA. Anto Antony of INC is the MP representing Punchavayal, Mundakayam.

Sabarigiri International Airport
On 19 of July 2017, the Kerala Government announced the construction of the 5th International Airport in Kerala, Sabarigiri International Airport at Cheruvally Estate of Harrisons Plantations at Erumely, situated at the Border of Kottayam District and Pathanamthitta district to facilitate the travel of Sabarimala pilgrims. The proposed project site Cheruvally Estate is just 13 km from Punchavayal.

Education
Sree Sabareesa College, Murikkumvayal
St. Mary's LP School, Punchavayal
Govt.Vocational HSS, Murikkumvayal

Major religious centres

Temples
Sree Cheruvally Devi Temple Punchayayal
Pachima Devi Temple, Pachima
Murikumvayal Sree Maha Vishnu Temple, Murikumvayal
Mahadeva Temple Pakkanam
Sree Krishna Temple Murikkumvayal
Vandanpara Temple
Amaravathy Sree Dharma Sastha Temple

Churches
St. Sebastian's Church Punchavayal

Masjids
Muhiyudheen Juma Masjid Kulamakkal
Punchavayal Masjid
Karinilam Muslim Juma Masjid
Muhiyudheen Juma Masjid Karinilam
Panakkachira Muslim Jama Ath

References

Villages in Kottayam district